Seaforth railway station (officially Seaforth Station) is a suburban railway station in Gosnells, a suburb of Perth, Western Australia. The station opened on 4 May 1948 with low level platforms. High level platforms were added in 1968. The station consists of two side platforms with a pedestrian level crossing. It is not fully accessible due to steep ramps and a lack of tactile paving.

Services are operated by Transperth Train Operations, a division of the state government's Public Transport Authority. Peak services reach seven trains per hour in each direction, whilst off-peak services are four trains per hour. The station is one of the least used ones on the Transperth network, with just 136 boardings per day in October 2017.

Description
Seaforth station is along the South Western Railway, which links Perth to Bunbury. The northern  of this railway, between Perth and Armadale, is used by Armadale line suburban rail services as part of the Transperth network. The line and the station is owned by the Public Transport Authority (PTA), an agency of the Government of Western Australia. Seaforth station is located between Gosnells station to the north and Kelmscott station to the south, within the suburb of Gosnells, Western Australia. This places the station in Transperth fare zone three.

The only way to cross the tracks is at a pedestrian level crossing at the southern end of the station. Two car parks with 41 bays in total are on Seaforth Avenue. Seaforth station is not fully accessible due to the ramps to the platforms being too steep and a lack of tactile paving.

History
After a campaign by the South-East Gosnells Progress Association, the station opened on 4 May 1948, although at the time, all it had were low level platforms and no name. Later that month, the Gosnells Road Board passed a motion that the name "Seaforth" be suggested to the Western Australian Government Railways (WAGR) after the name of a local estate. When WAGR sought approval for the name from Canberra, they were reluctant to approve the name as it was used for stations in all other Australian states. The station had since become colloquially known as "Woop Woop". Seaforth was eventually approved though in April 1949.

In 1968, high level platforms were constructed.

Services
Seaforth station is served by Armadale line services operated by Transperth Train Operations, a division of the PTA. The line goes between Perth station and Armadale station. Armadale line services reach seven trains per hour during peak, dropping down to four trains per hour between peaks. At night, there are two trains per hour, dropping to one train per hour in the early hours of the morning. Apart from at night and on Sundays/public holidays, most train services follow the "C" stopping pattern, which skips Burswood, Victoria Park, Carlisle, Welshpool and Queens Park stations. There are also two "B" stopping pattern services which run during the afternoon Armadale-bound. Those services are the same as the "C" pattern except they stop at Queens Park. Starting at night, trains stop at all stations. On Sundays and public holidays, half of all trains are "C" pattern trains and half are all stops trains.

On Seaforth Avenue is a pair of bus stops for route 907, the rail replacement bus service. On Albany Highway is a pair of bus stops for route 220, which runs along Albany Highway from Perth to Armadale.

In the 2013–14 financial year, Seaforth station had 51,887 boardings, making it the least used station on the Armadale and Thornlie lines. On an average weekday in October 2017, the station had 136 boardings, making it the least used Transperth station. The weekend average number of boardings was 170 in October 2018, making it the second least used Transperth station after Success Hill station. In 2018, City of Armadale Mayor Henry Zelones said that several hundred hectares of vacant land nearby had been set for high density development, which would increase patronage.

Notes

References

External links

Armadale and Thornlie lines
Railway stations in Perth, Western Australia
Railway stations in Australia opened in 1948